The Dutch shipbuilding firm The Damen Group, designs and manufactures a range of patrol vessels, of various sizes, including the Damen Stan 4207 Patrol Vessels.  The Damen Stan patrol vessel designs' names include a four digit code, where the first two digits are the vessel's length, in metres, and the second two digits are its width.

Operators 
Over a dozen nations have classes of vessels based on the Damen Stan 4207 patrol vessel design, including:
Albanian Coast Guard (4)
Royal Bahamas Defence Force (4)
Barbados Coast Guard
Bulgarian Border Police
Canadian Coast Guard
Honduran Navy
Jamaica Defence Force
Mexican Navy
Netherlands Coast Guard
Nicaraguan Navy
United Kingdom Border Force
Venezuelan Navy
Vietnam (Vietnam Maritime search and Rescue Coordination Center & Vietnam Border Guard)

Some variants are equipped with deck guns, while others are equipped for peacetime duties like search and rescue, fishery protection, environmental monitoring, or intercepting smugglers.

Ships in class

References

Damen Group
Patrol vessels